Osmolal gap can refer to:
 Serum osmolal gap
 Stool osmolal gap